Pelotón VIP is the third series of the popular Chilean TV reality show Pelotón, produced by Televisión Nacional de Chile (TVN).

The series ran from April to November 2009, featuring a number of Chilean celebrities, with Karen Doggenweiler and Rafael Araneda as the presenters. The first prize was 50 million Chilean pesos.

Francisco Schilling was announced as the winner, in a prime-time broadcast on 17 November 2009.

Contestants 

{|class="wikitable sortable"
|-
!Name
!Age!!Eliminated||Previously
|-
|bgcolor=""| Francisco Schilling
| align="center" |27
Winner
|bgcolor="gray" align="center"|
|-
|bgcolor=""| María Eugenia Larraín
| align="center" |36
2nd place
16th eliminated
|-
|bgcolor=""| Nabih Chadud
| align="center" |32
3rd place
|bgcolor="gray" align="center"|
|-
|bgcolor=""| Angie Alvarado 
| align="center" |19
19th eliminated
7th eliminated
|-
|bgcolor=""| Pablo Schilling
| align="center" |25
18th eliminated
|bgcolor="gray" align="center"|
|-
|bgcolor=""| Francini Amaral
| align="center" |26
17theliminated
|bgcolor="gray" align="center"|
|-
|bgcolor=""| Mario Larraín
| align="center" |36
Quit
|bgcolor="gray" align="center"|
|-
|bgcolor=""| Óscar Garcés
| align="center" |27
15th eliminated
4th eliminated
|-
|bgcolor=""| Carla Ochoa
| align="center" |30
14th eliminated
|bgcolor="gray" align="center"|
|-
|bgcolor=""| Gyvens Laguerre
| align="center" |29
13th eliminated
|bgcolor="gray" align="center"|
|-
|bgcolor=""| Maximiliano Mellado
| align="center" |20
12th eliminated
|bgcolor="gray" align="center"|
|-
|bgcolor=""| Mariela Montero
| align="center" |29
11th eliminated
|bgcolor="gray" align="center"|
|-
|bgcolor=""| Anoika Wade 
| align="center" |24
10th eliminated
9th eliminated
|-
|bgcolor=""| Juan Cristóbal Foxley
| align="center" |41
Quit
|bgcolor="gray" align="center"|
|-
|bgcolor=""| Carolina Sotomayor
| align="center" |33
8th eliminated
|bgcolor="gray" align="center"|
|-
|bgcolor=""| Romina Martin
| align="center" |24
6th eliminated
|bgcolor="gray" align="center"|
|-
|bgcolor=""| Katherine Orellana
| align="center" |23
5th eliminated
3rd eliminated
|-
|bgcolor=""| Miguel Esbir
| align="center" |52
Quit
|bgcolor="gray" align="center"|
|-
|bgcolor=""| Isabel Fernández
| align="center" |22
2nd eliminated
|bgcolor="gray" align="center"|
|-
|bgcolor=""| Françoise Perrot 
| align="center" |22
Quit
|bgcolor="gray" align="center"|
|-
|bgcolor=""| Cristián Vidal
| align="center" |28
1st eliminated
|bgcolor="gray" align="center"|
|}

Sources 
 TVN: Pelotón website 

Chilean reality television series